Hans Inge Myrvold (born 25 January 1985) is a Norwegian politician for the Centre Party.

He became a member of Kvinnherad municipal council in 2011, deputy mayor in 2015 and mayor in 2019. He served as a deputy representative to the Parliament of Norway from Hordaland during the terms 2017–2021 and 2021–2025. He met regularly in place of Kjersti Toppe from 2021, and took a seat in the Standing Committee on Health and Care Services.

References

1985 births
Living people
People from Kvinnherad
Deputy members of the Storting
Centre Party (Norway) politicians
Mayors of places in Hordaland
21st-century Norwegian politicians